Antonio Guerao Mayoral (born 28 April 1979), known as Tonet, is a Spanish retired footballer. Mainly a left midfielder, he could also operate as a central defender or a left back.

Club career

Spain
Born in Barcelona, Catalonia, Tonet was an unsuccessful FC Barcelona youth graduate. He played professionally for Deportivo Alavés B, CF Gavà, Real Oviedo B, Real Ávila CF, SD Compostela, CF Reus Deportiu, CF Rayo Majadahonda, CF Fuenlabrada, AD Alcorcón and CE L'Hospitalet.

In a full decade, Tonet never appeared in higher than Segunda División B.

St Mirren
On 4 August 2008 Tonet moved to the Scottish Premier League, signing a one-year contract with St Mirren after impressing on trial in pre-season, which included a goal against Football League Championship's Blackpool.

His league debut came against Celtic in a 0–1 away defeat, and he went on to play in the first four games, being sent off against Heart of Midlothian in another loss. However, after suffering a foot injury from which he never fully recovered, he was deemed surplus to requirements early in the following year, and released by manager Gus MacPherson at the season's end.

Return to Spain
After being released by Saints in the summer of 2009, Tonet returned to his country, joining lowly Villajoyosa CF in the third level. After the Valencian club's relegation he stayed in that category, signing a one-year deal with CD La Muela in Zaragoza, Aragon, and meeting the same fate.

Personal life
Tonet's younger brother, Andreu, was also a professional footballer. Groomed also at Barcelona he appeared in La Liga for Sporting de Gijón, albeit with little impact, and played abroad most notably in Poland.

References

External links

1979 births
Living people
Footballers from Barcelona
Spanish footballers
Association football defenders
Association football midfielders
Association football utility players
Segunda División B players
Tercera División players
Deportivo Alavés B players
CF Gavà players
Real Oviedo Vetusta players
SD Compostela footballers
CF Reus Deportiu players
CF Rayo Majadahonda players
CF Fuenlabrada footballers
AD Alcorcón footballers
CE L'Hospitalet players
Villajoyosa CF footballers
Scottish Premier League players
St Mirren F.C. players
Spanish expatriate footballers
Expatriate footballers in Scotland
Spanish expatriate sportspeople in Scotland